Tilhar is a city and very old tehsil of Uttar Pradesh, and municipal board of the Shahjahanpur district in the Indian state of Uttar Pradesh. It is also a constituency of Uttar Pradesh Vidhan Sabha. As the city was also known to supply bows to Mughul armies, Tilhar was also known as Kamaan Nagar during the reign of emeror Jahangeer.

Demographics
As 2001 Census of India, Tilhar had a population of 52,909, out of which 27,667 are males and 25,242 are females. Tilhar has an average literacy rate of 50.77%, below the state average of 67.68%; male literacy is 55.53%, and female literacy is 45.63%. In Tilhar, 14% of the population is under 0 — 6 years of age.

References
 

Cities and towns in Shahjahanpur district